Sagharan-e Sofla (also Romanized as Sāgharān-e Soflá and Sāqerān-e Soflá; also known as Meykand, Sāgharī-ye Soflá, Yangī Kand, and Yaqī Kand) is a village in Abgarm Rural District, Abgarm District, Avaj County, Qazvin Province, Iran. At the 2006 census, its population was 212, in 54 families.

References 

Populated places in Avaj County